Lanark South was a federal electoral district represented in the House of Commons of Canada from 1867 to 1917. It was located in the province of Ontario. It was created by the British North America Act of 1867 which divided the County of Lanark into two ridings: Lanark South and Lanark North.

In 1882, the South Riding of Lanark was defined as consisting of the townships of Bathurst, North Elmsley, Beckwith, South Sherbrooke, North Burgess, Drummond and Montague, the Town of Perth, and the Village of Carleton Place.

In 1903, the Town of Smith's Falls was added to the riding, and the Village of Carleton Place was excluded.

The electoral district was abolished in 1914 when it was merged into Lanark riding.

Electoral history

|}

On Mr. Morris being named Minister of Inland Revenue, 16 November 1869:

|}

|}

|}

|}

|}

|}

On Mr. Haggart being named Postmaster General, 3 August 1888:

|}

|}

|}

|}

|}

|}

On Mr. Haggart's death, 13 March 1913:

|}

See also 

 List of Canadian federal electoral districts
 Past Canadian electoral districts

External links 
 Parliamentary website

Former federal electoral districts of Ontario